Kappa Crucis (κ Cru, HD 111973) is a spectroscopic binary star in the open cluster NGC 4755, which is also known as the Kappa Crucis Cluster or Jewel Box Cluster.

Location

κ Crucis is one of the brightest members of the open cluster that bears its name, better known as the Jewel Box Cluster. It forms one leg, at bottom right or south, of the prominent letter "A" asterism at the centre of the cluster. The cluster is part of the larger Centaurus OB1 association and lies about 8,500 light-years away.

The cluster, and κ Cru itself, is just to the south-east of β Crucis, the lefthand star of the famous Southern Cross.

Properties
κ Crucis is a B3 bright supergiant (luminosity class Ia). Radial velocity variations in the spectral lines indicate that it has an unresolved companion star. The κ Crucis cluster has a calculated age of 11.2 million years.

References

External links
 

Crux (constellation)
Crucis, Kappa
111973
B-type supergiants
062931
4890
Durchmusterung objects
J12534890-6022344
Spectroscopic binaries